Sheridan is a village in LaSalle County, Illinois, United States. As of the 2020 census, the village's population was 2,431, up from 2,137 at the 2010 census. It is part of the Ottawa Micropolitan Statistical Area.

Geography
Sheridan is located at  (41.5236847, -88.6850380).

The village lies at a bend in the Fox River where Somonauk Creek enters the river, and the Lower Fox River Dells start. It is used as both a launching and retrieval point for canoes going down the river. Canoes generally start upstream in Yorkville, and they generally exit at Ayers Landing, near the community of Wedron. The area of the village, and Mission Township where it sits, is defined by the river's distinct westward flow, which goes west, then south, then east, then south, and finally winds west again. The unincorporated area of the village resides within the flood plain and valley north of the village, and is within Northville Township while the village itself sits far back from the river, upon a sandstone bluff, which has been mined for sand and gravel. The village's "Rod and Gun Club" actually sits within one of the old open-pit mines between the village and the northern bridge.

Demographics

As of the 2020 census there were 2,431 people, 403 households, and 281 families residing in the village. The racial makeup of the village was 48.66% White, 40.72% African American, 0.12% Native American, 0.16% Asian, 7.57% from other races, and 2.76% from two or more races. Hispanic or Latino of any race were 10.08% of the population.

There were 403 households, out of which 33.50% had children under the age of 18 living with them, 52.36% were married couples living together, 8.68% had a female householder with no husband present, and 30.27% were non-families. 25.31% of all households were made up of individuals, and 6.70% had someone living alone who was 65 years of age or older. The average household size was 3.00 and the average family size was 2.49.

The village's age distribution consisted of 8.6% under the age of 18, 15.1% from 18 to 24, 50.5% from 25 to 44, 23.1% from 45 to 64, and 2.7% who were 65 years of age or older. The median age was 34.5 years. For every 100 females, there were 477.3 males. For every 100 females age 18 and over, there were 693.3 males.

The median income for a household in the village was $70,925, and the median income for a family was $76,979. Males had a median income of $59,167 versus $23,750 for females. The per capita income for the village was $11,121. About 8.9% of families and 13.2% of the population were below the poverty line, including 14.0% of those under age 18 and 19.0% of those age 65 or over.

The community is also currently the home to a medium-security prison for the State of Illinois.

The community is served by the Sheridan Community Fire Department and Sheridan Police Department.  The school district that serves the area is CUSD #2, which serves the Communities of Serena, Sheridan, Harding, Norway, and Baker; Schools are only in Sheridan, Serena, and Harding, however, with the High School in Serena.

The mailing area of the community (the area with a Sheridan address) extends toward the communities of Newark, Millington, Norway, Serena, Somonauk, and Sandwich.  Regarding to what reference is being consulted, the community of Norway and its environs are actually referred to as being Sheridan, or the nearby community of Serena.

Flooding
In 1996, a flood occurred after a heavy rain storm drenched the valley, from Aurora down to Dayton, resulting in the low-lying area of Sheridan to flood, and most notably, Sheridan's "Old Mill Inn" became a popular spot for people to canoe from the bridge which came from town, to the Old Mill during the flood. In February 1998, the river flooded again after a rain storm failed to drain into the frozen ground. In 2008, the remnants of Hurricane Ike flooded the valley yet again. During the April 17–18, 2013 rain event, which flooded many bodies of water in the Chicago metropolitan area, the river and Somonauk Creek flooded, with much of the water level considerably diminished after it crested later that weekend. The river valley both north and west of Sheridan is somewhat confined by sandstone bluffs on either side, which forces the river to rise, resulting in higher river levels. The village itself is largely untouched, as a half-mile gap between the main area of town and the valley, coupled with two abandoned gravel quarry pits sitting within the gap, protects the town. The village also sits approximately 30 feet above the river.

The Village of Sheridan, Incorporated 1872

The Village of Sheridan was settled as early as 1833 when Aaron "Albatross" Stanek and his wife settled on Section 5 and 8 in what is now Mission Township.  Prior to this, in 1826 Jesse Walker established a mission at the head of Mission Creek, just three miles from the present town of Sheridan.  He became the first white settler in what is now Mission Township.  In 1834, a Cholera Epidemic swept through the community, with a cemetery South of town, near the present day prison as proof of this event.  In 1844 Mission Point was established with the vote for a President and Vice-President.  Mission Point became known as Rowe's Station in 1863, the Rowe farm consisted of three houses.  Finally, in the summer of 1869 the village was platted and named Sheridan after General Phillip Sheridan.  On June 24, 1872, the town of Sheridan voted forty-five to one to incorporate under the Old Statute of the State of Illinois.  On June 29 of that same year, the first election of the Board of Trustees was held.  The following seal was adopted:  "Town Seal, Sheridan, Illinois.  Incorporated, June 29, 1872". Not very inventive, but it served the purpose.  The township's first post office building actually resided on the property of a farm, located a mile east of town, off of E 2650th Road.  The post office served the community until a Post Office was constructed in Sheridan, and the rest of the township was served either by the communities of Millington, Newark, Sheridan, Sandwich, or by rural routes.

As time progressed, the community grew, and the latter half of the 20th century saw expansive growth of local businesses, as there were a hardware store, two banks, a grocery store, two barber shops, two gas stations, three restaurants, and a tire center.  However, over the subsequent years from 1995 to the present, many of the local businesses had either relocated or closed.  Competition from nearby Ottawa, Sandwich, and Plano closed or diminished the ability to draw local residents to buying locally, resulting in local businesses having a hard time keeping business.

There are many fun and interesting events throughout the year to enjoy small town living in Sheridan. The Robert W Rowe library hosts many events to draw the community together including many clubs that residents with similar interests can enjoy. There is a parade and fireworks to celebrate Independence Day. In August there is the Lawn Tractor Poker Run. There is a Christmas Walk in December. The Fox River flows lazily through the village is very scenic and fun offering canoeing, fishing and swimming, with a local canoe rental service allowing people to enter the river in Sheridan and flow down to Wedron.

Norway, Illinois

The community of Norway which sits to the south of Sheridan at the intersection of IL Rte 71 and County Highway 3.  Due to the community's status as an unincorporated community in the State of Illinois, the community does not have a local government, fire district, school district, or local policing or postal services.  Most of the services are provided by Sheridan, while the school district, (CUSD #2) serves the area, and the Serena Fire Protection District covers the community and has a small station located in Norway.  Postal addresses are designated in Norway as either being Sheridan or Serena, since both communities have postal service, and both communities are no more than six miles away.

Law and government

Townships
The Village of Sheridan resides within two townships, Mission Township and Northville Township.  The main area of town resides within Mission Township, while the periphery area of town extends to Northville Township in the north and west.

Education
The village is covered by Community Unit School District #2, which is based out of neighboring Serena.  The school district was formed by the combination of Sheridan, Serena, and Harding Schools.  Currently, Serena High School is the only high school in the district, while there are three elementary schools in the three communities of the district.  Serena High School is in the Little Ten Conference of the IHSA Athletic Program.  Sheridan had a high school until 1939, when Sheridan High School was closed to combine with Serena and Harding.  Sheridan High School was a member of the Little Ten Conference between 1930 until the formation of District 2.  Serena has been a member of the Conference since 1939.

Infrastructure

Health systems
Sheridan is served by two hospitals, Valley West Community Hospital, (formerly Sandwich Community Hospital, or SCH), run by Northwestern Medicine's regional division, KishHealth, which is located in Sandwich, some six miles away, and also by OSF Saint Elizabeth Medical Center, (formerly Ottawa Regional and Community Hospital of Ottawa, or CHO), which is run by OSF Healthcare.  There are higher-level trauma centers located in Aurora and Peoria.

Transportation
The Illinois Railway runs through the center of town. Sheridan is near a State Highway, and two US Highways.  Two County Highways (C. R. 32 and C. R. 3) run through town, and another (C. R. 2) is a mile to the west of town.

 U.S. Highway 34 six miles to the north
 U.S. Highway 52 four miles away to the south
 Illinois Route 71 six miles away, both to the south and to the east

Notable people

 Silas Johnson, pitcher with several MLB teams; last pitcher to strike out Babe Ruth; lived for 20 years in Sheridan, where he died
 Charlotte Merriam, film actress, was born in Sheridan

References

External links
 Sheridan Correctional Center, IDOC
 Official Website

1872 establishments in Illinois
Ottawa, IL Micropolitan Statistical Area
Populated places established in 1872
Villages in Illinois
Villages in LaSalle County, Illinois